Goopy Geer is an animated cartoon character created in 1932 for the Merrie Melodies series of cartoons from Warner Bros. He's a singing, dancing, piano-playing dog who is considered to be "the first Merrie Melodies star", although he only starred in three cartoons.

History
The character is a tall, lanky anthropomorphic dog with scruffy whiskers and long, expressive ears. He was "a wisecracking entertainer -- 'part comedian, part musician and part dancer' -- inspired by vaudeville showmen of [the 1930s]."

Goopy's character was based on a familiar archetype of entertainment, as Hank Sartin says in Reading the Rabbit:

In all of his animated appearances, Goopy is depicted as light colored, but in an early promotional drawing for his first cartoon, he had black fur.

Goopy Geer was the last attempt by animator Rudolf Ising to feature a recurring character in the Merrie Melodies series of films. Like most other early sound-era cartoon characters, Ising's Goopy has little personality of his own. Instead, he sings and dances his way through a musical world in perfect syncopation. Ising only featured the character in three cartoons.

In the first, "Goopy Geer" (April 16, 1932), he plays a popular pianist entertaining at a nightclub. In Ising's other two Goopy films, both in 1932, he cast the dog first as a hillbilly in "Moonlight for Two" (June 11, 1932), then as a court jester in "The Queen Was in the Parlor" (July 9, 1932). All of these cartoons also feature Goopy's unnamed girlfriend who debuted without her gangly consort in the earlier Merrie Melodie "Freddy the Freshman" (February 20, 1932).

A month after Goopy Geer's first cartoon had been released, Walt Disney released a cartoon called "Mickey's Revue" with a character named Dippy Dawg, whose overall appearance was very similar to that of Goopy Geer; due to the close proximity of the two cartoons' releases, there is little chance that either character was intended to be a copy of the other. Dippy Dawg would eventually be renamed to "Goofy".

Goopy made a cameo in the Bosko cartoon "Bosko in Dutch" (January 14, 1933), but after Ising left Warner Bros. that same year, Goopy and other recurring Merrie Melodies characters were retired, to be later replaced by such recurring characters as Sniffles the Mouse, Inki and the Mynah Bird, the Curious Puppies, and, on two occasions, Porky Pig (a character who was more prevalent in the black and white Looney Tunes).

Later appearances
Goopy Geer had a small role in the 1990s animated series Tiny Toon Adventures episode "Two-Tone Town" voiced by Robert Morse. Goopy, reprising his role as the happy-go-lucky pianist from his first cartoon, meets the series' stars when they visit the "black-and-white" part of town. His appearance in this cartoon is updated somewhat and seems to be based on early promotional drawings where his fur is black rather than his actual cartoon appearances.

References

External linksGoopy Geer'' at the TCM Movie Database
Goopy Geer at The Big Cartoon DataBase
Goopy Geer at Don Markstein's Toonopedia. Archived from the original on August 3, 2016.
 

Film characters introduced in 1932
Anthropomorphic dogs
Looney Tunes characters